Głogowiec  is a village in the administrative district of Gmina Tryńcza, within Przeworsk County, Podkarpackie Voivodeship, in south-eastern Poland.

It lies on the confluence of San and Wisłok rivers.

References

Villages in Przeworsk County